is a Japanese female javelin thrower, who won an individual gold medal at the Youth World Championships. She also has the Japanese national record for the same event, as she threw 66.00 m at the Honjo Athletic Stadium in Kitakyushu in 2019. At the 2022 World Athletics Championships she won a bronze medal, which made her the first Japanese woman to win a medal in any throwing event at a World Championships or Olympics.

References

External links

1998 births
Living people
Japanese female javelin throwers
Japan Championships in Athletics winners
World Athletics Championships athletes for Japan
World Athletics Championships medalists
Olympic athletes of Japan
Athletes (track and field) at the 2020 Summer Olympics
Olympic female javelin throwers
21st-century Japanese women
Universiade medalists in athletics (track and field)
Universiade silver medalists for Japan